The IBM Association of Tennis Professionals (ATP) Tour is the elite tour for professional men's tennis organized by the ATP tour. The IBM ATP Tour includes the Grand Slam tournaments (organized by the International Tennis Federation (ITF)), the ATP Championship Series, Single Week, the ATP Championship Series, the ATP World Series, the ATP World Team Cup, the Davis Cup (organized by the ITF), the ATP Tour World Championships and the Grand Slam Cup (organized by the ITF).

Schedule 
This is the complete schedule of events on the 1993 IBM ATP Tour, with player progression documented from the quarterfinals stage.
Key

January

February

March

April

May

June

July

August

September

October

November

December

ATP rankings

Statistical information 
List of players and titles won, alphabetically by last name:
  Chuck Adams - Seoul (1)
  Andre Agassi - San Francisco, Scottsdale (2)
  Jordi Arrese - Athens (1)
  Boris Becker - Doha, Milan (2)
  Alberto Berasategui - São Paulo (1)
  Arnaud Boetsch - Rosmalen, Toulouse (2)
  Sergi Bruguera - Monte Carlo Masters, French Open, Gstaad, Prague, Bordeaux (5)
  Jordi Burillo - Bologna (1)
  Michael Chang - Jakarta, Osaka, Cincinnati Masters, Kuala Lumpur Indoors, Beijing (5)
  Carlos Costa - Hilversum, Buenos Aires (2)
  Jim Courier - Australian Open, Memphis, Indian Wells Masters, Rome Masters, Indianapolis (5)
  Stefan Edberg - Madrid (1)
  Jacco Eltingh - Atlanta (1)
  Thomas Enqvist - Schenectady (1)
  Javier Frana - Santiago (1)
  Marc-Kevin Goellner - Nice (1)
  Magnus Gustafsson - Stuttgart (1)
  Goran Ivanišević - Bucharest, Vienna, Paris Masters (3)
  Anders Järryd - Rotterdam (1)
  Richard Krajicek - Los Angeles (1)
  Aaron Krickstein - Durban (1)
  Nicklas Kulti - Adelaide (1)
  Henri Leconte - Halle (1)
  Ivan Lendl - Munich, Tokyo Indoors (2)
  Amos Mansdorf - Washington, D.C. (1)
  Todd Martin - Coral Springs (1)
  Andrei Medvedev - Estoril, Barcelona, New Haven (3)
  Thomas Muster - Mexico City, Florence, Genova, Kitzbühel, San Marino, Umag, Palermo (7)
  Karel Nováček - Dubai, Zaragoza (2)
  Andrei Olhovskiy - Copenhagen (1)
  Horacio de la Peña - Charlotte (1)
  Guillermo Pérez Roldán - Casablanca (1)
  Mikael Pernfors - Canada Masters (1)
  Stefano Pescosolido - Tel Aviv (1)
  Richey Reneberg - Kuala Lumpur (1)
  Marc Rosset - Marseille, Long Island, Moscow (3)
  Greg Rusedski - Newport (1)
  Pete Sampras - Sydney, Miami Masters, Tokyo, Hong Kong, Wimbledon, US Open, Lyon, Antwerp (8)
  Horst Skoff - Båstad (1)
  Jonathan Stark - Bolzano (1)
  Michael Stich - Stuttgart, Hamburg Masters, London, Basel, Stockholm Masters, Season-Ending Championships (6)
  Jason Stoltenberg - Manchester (1)
  Alexander Volkov - Auckland (1)
  Mark Woodforde - Philadelphia (1)
  Jaime Yzaga - Tampa, Sydney Indoors (2)

The following players won their first title:
  Chuck Adams
  Alberto Berasategui
  Arnaud Boetsch
  Jordi Burillo
  Marc-Kevin Goellner
  Todd Martin
  Andrei Olhovskiy
  Greg Rusedski
  Jonathan Stark
  Jason Stoltenberg

See also 
 1993 WTA Tour

External links 
 1993 ATP Results Archive
 History Men's Professional Tours

 
ATP Tour
ATP Tour seasons